Chasin' the Bird is an album by pianist Barry Harris recorded in 1962 and released on the Riverside label.

Reception

AllMusic awarded the album 4 stars with its review by Scott Yanow stating, "This is excellent music that should please bop collectors."

Track listing 
All compositions by Barry Harris except as indicated
 "Chasin' the Bird" (Charlie Parker) – 5:32  
 "The Breeze and I" (Ernesto Lecuona, Al Stillman) – 4:14  
 "Around the Corner" – 3:01  
 "Just as Though You Were Here" (John Benson Brooks, Eddie DeLange) – 3:38  
 "(Back Home Again in) Indiana" (James F. Hanley, Ballard MacDonald) – 2:54  
 "Stay Right with It" – 5:12  
 "'Round Midnight" (Thelonious Monk) – 5:22  
 "Bish Bash Bosh" – 4:32  
 "The Way You Look Tonight" (Dorothy Fields, Jerome Kern) – 4:55

Personnel 
Barry Harris – piano
Bob Cranshaw – bass
Clifford Jarvis – drums

References 

Barry Harris albums
1962 albums
Riverside Records albums
Albums produced by Orrin Keepnews